Opel Movano (Vauxhall Movano in the United Kingdom) is a name that has been used for several large vans.

The first-generation Opel Movano was based on the second-generation Renault Master. It was produced between 1998 and 2010.
The second-generation Opel Movano was based on the third-generation Renault Master. It was produced between 2010 and 2021.
The third-generation Opel Movano was based on the third-generation Fiat Ducato. It has been in production .